William Jackson  was an Anglican priest in Ireland during the 19th century.

Jackson was born in Mayo, County Mayo and  educated at Trinity College Dublin. He was ordained in 1834 and his first post was a curacy in Headford. He was  the incumbent at Castleconner from 1866 and Dean of Killala from 1872, holding both post until his death in 1885.

Notes

Alumni of Trinity College Dublin
Church of Ireland priests
19th-century Irish Anglican priests
1885 deaths
Deans of Killala
Religious leaders from County Mayo